Craywick (French Flemish: Craeywyck and Dutch: Kraaiwijk) is a commune in the Nord department in northern France.

Heraldry

One of the very few places in France with an English name.

Gallery

See also
Communes of the Nord department

References

Communes of Nord (French department)
French Flanders